Port of Temptation (Spanish: Puerto de tentación) is a 1951 Mexican drama film directed by René Cardona and starring Emilia Guiú.

The film's sets were designed by the art director Francisco Marco Chillet.

Cast
 Julio Ahuet 
 Ramón Armengod 
 José Arratia 
 Victorio Blanco 
 Florencio Castelló 
 Alejandro Ciangherotti 
 Pedro González Rojas 
 Emilia Guiú 
 José María Linares-Rivas 
 Álvaro Matute 
 Nelly Montiel 
 José Luis Moreno 
 Pepe Nava 
 Gloria Ríos
 Juan Bruno Tarraza 
 Hernán Vera 
 María Victoria

References

Bibliography 
 Román Gubern. El Cine Español en el Exilio. Lumen, 1976.

External links 
 

1951 films
1951 drama films
Mexican drama films
1950s Spanish-language films
Films directed by René Cardona
Mexican black-and-white films
1950s Mexican films